Conor Timmins (born September 18, 1998) is a Canadian professional ice hockey defenceman currently playing for the  Toronto Maple Leafs in the National Hockey League (NHL). He was selected by the Colorado Avalanche, 32nd overall, in the 2017 NHL Entry Draft.

Playing career

Junior
Timmins played minor midget with the Southern Tier Admirals of the South-Central Triple A Hockey League. He was selected in the 4th round (79th overall) of the 2014 OHL Priority Selection by the Sault Ste. Marie Greyhounds. Timmins started his first season of junior hockey with the Thorold Blackhawks of the Greater Ontario Junior Hockey League before being traded to the St. Catharines Falcons. He debuted for the Greyhounds in the 2015–16 season, scoring 13 points in 60 games.

In the 2016–17 season, Timmins scored 61 points (7 goals and 54 assists) and played in the CHL/NHL Top Prospects Game. Going into the 2017 NHL Entry Draft, Timmins was ranked the 18th best North American skater by NHL Central Scouting. He was taken by the Colorado Avalanche with the first selection of the second round (32nd overall). Timmins returned to the Greyhounds for the 2017–18 season, scoring 41 points (8 goals, 33 assists) in 36 games. He signed a three-year, entry-level contract with the Avalanche on March 2, 2018.

Professional
Timmins suffered a concussion at the end of his final season in junior hockey, and he continued to have symptoms that kept him from playing in any games for the Avalanche or their AHL affiliate, the Colorado Eagles in the 2018–19 season.

On October 1, 2019, the Avalanche announced that Timmins had made the opening-night roster. He made his NHL debut on the Avalanche's third defensive pairing in a 5–3 season opening victory over the Calgary Flames on October 3, 2019. After his second game with the Avalanche, Timmins was reassigned to the Colorado Eagles on October 7, 2019.

At the conclusion of his entry-level contract, as a restricted free agent, Timmins was traded by the Avalanche along with a first-round selection in 2022 and conditional third-round draft selection in 2024 to the Arizona Coyotes in exchange for starting goaltender Darcy Kuemper on July 28, 2021. He was later signed by the Coyotes, to a two-year, $1.7 million contract extension on August 6, 2021. Six games into his tenure with Arizona, Timmins suffered a knee injury that required season ending surgery.

Returning to health to open the  season with the Coyotes, Timmins appeared in two games before suffering another injury on October 15, 2022. On November 8, Timmins was re-assigned on a conditioning assignment to AHL affiliate, the Tucson Roadrunners, appearing in 6 games for 3 assists. In returning to the Coyotes following completion of his conditioning re-assignment, Timmins was traded by Arizona to the Toronto Maple Leafs in exchange for Curtis Douglas on November 23, 2022.

International play

Timmins was selected to Canada's under-20 team for the 2018 World Junior Championships in Buffalo, New York, winning gold. He scored 5 points in the tournament, including an assist on the game-winning goal in the gold-medal game. He also led the tournament in plus/minus at +15.

Career statistics

Regular season and playoffs

International

References

External links

1998 births
Living people
Arizona Coyotes players
Canadian ice hockey defencemen
Colorado Avalanche draft picks
Colorado Avalanche players
Colorado Eagles players
Ice hockey people from Ontario
Sault Ste. Marie Greyhounds players
Sportspeople from St. Catharines
Toronto Maple Leafs players
Tucson Roadrunners players